Karma Loday Bhutia is an Indian politician. He was elected to the Sikkim Legislative Assembly from Kabi Lungchok in the 2019 Sikkim Legislative Assembly election as a member of the Sikkim Krantikari Morcha. He is Minister of Forest, Environment & Wildlife, Mines, Mineral & Geology and Science & technology in P. S. Golay Cabinet.

References

1965 births
Living people
Sikkim Krantikari Morcha politicians
People from Gangtok
Sikkim MLAs 2019–2024
University of North Bengal alumni